Syana may refer to:

 Siana, a city in Uttar Pradesh, India
 Syana Tehsil
Syana (Assembly constituency)
 Kurilsk, formerly known as Syana, a town in Russia

See also 
 Siana (disambiguation)